Orinda Academy (OA) is a secondary school located in Orinda, California, United States.

History
Orinda Academy, formerly known as the North Bay Secondary School, is a private school that was founded in 1982.

Orinda Academy, registered as the North Bay Secondary School, was founded in 1982.

Two Schools
In the mid 1980s, North Bay Secondary School split into two schools; Orinda Academy/North Bay Secondary School  and North Bay Marin School but remained a single corporation with a single Board of Directors. In 1998, Orinda Academy legally separated from the North Bay Marin School. (The North Bay Marin School subsequently changed its name to The Marin School).

In 1994, Orinda Academy moved to its current site at 19 Altarinda Road, Orinda, with close proximity to the Orinda BART station. In 2003, North Bay Orinda School changed its name to Orinda Academy.  The school is named after the city of Orinda in which it is located. In the spring of 2018, Ron Graydon, the founder of Orinda Academy and Head of School for 36 years retired. Dr. Susan Eva Porter, formerly of the Bay School of San Francisco, became the new Head of School.

References

External links
 The Orinda Academy website

High schools in Contra Costa County, California
Private high schools in California
Preparatory schools in California
Educational institutions established in 1980
1980 establishments in California